St. Joseph Catholic Academy is a Catholic elementary and secondary parochial school in Kenosha, Wisconsin, created on July 1, 2010 as a result of the merging of St. Mark Elementary School, St. Joseph Interparish Junior High School, and St. Joseph High School. The school serves students from pre-kindergarten to 12th grade.

History
St. Joseph High School was founded in 1958 by the School Sisters of the Third Order of St Francis and the Catholic parishes of Kenosha. In 2010, St. Joseph High School was combined with St. Mark the Evangelist Elementary School and St. Joseph Interparish Junior High School to form the St. Joseph Catholic Academy.

Accreditation

Accreditation is through AdvancED, which consists of North Central Association Commission on Acccreditation and School Improvement (NCA CASI), Northwest Accreditation Commission (NWAC) and Southern Association of Colleges and School Council on Accreditation and School Improvement (SACS CASI).

Archdiocesan and parish affiliations

St. Joseph Catholic Academy is operated by the Archdiocese of Milwaukee and supported by all Kenosha area parishes. The school receives support from all 10 Catholic parishes in Kenosha and Pleasant Prairie: Our Lady of Mount Carmel, Our Lady of the Holy Rosary of Pompeii, St. Anne Catholic Church, St. Anthony of Padua, St. Elizabeth Catholic Church, St. James the Apostle, St. Mary Catholic Church, St. Mark the Evangelist, St. Peter Parish, and St. Therese of Lisieux.

Notable alumni
 Kate Del Fava, soccer player

References

External links
 

Roman Catholic Archdiocese of Milwaukee
High schools in Kenosha, Wisconsin
Educational institutions established in 2010
Catholic schools in Wisconsin
2010 establishments in Wisconsin